The Botanischer Garten Karlsruhe is a municipal botanical garden located in  Karlsruhe, Baden-Württemberg, Germany. This garden should not be confused with the nearby Botanischer Garten der Universität Karlsruhe operated by the University of Karlsruhe.

The garden was established by Charles III William, Margrave of Baden-Durlach and designed by Karl Christian Gmelin. Between 1853 and 1857, three plant houses were created by architect Heinrich Hübsch. The buildings were severely damaged or destroyed in World War II, but reconstructed as follows: camellia and flower house, rebuilt 1952 for cactus and succulent exhibition; palm house, rebuilt 1955 to 1956; tropical house, restored in the 1950s.  The plant houses are open daily except Monday; an admission fee is charged. The grounds contain several rare trees from the 19th century amid newer plantings.

See also 
 Botanischer Garten der Universität Karlsruhe
 List of botanical gardens in Germany

References

External links 

 Botanischer Garten Karlsruhe
 Garden map
 Botanischer Garten Karlsruhe
 StadtWiki entry (Stadtwiki Karlsruhe)
 GardenVisit entry

Karlsruhe, Botanischer Garten
Karlsruhe, Botanischer Garten
Buildings and structures in Karlsruhe
Tourist attractions in Karlsruhe